Andrew Marshall Brown (born September 10, 1984) is an American former professional baseball outfielder. He has previously played in Major League Baseball (MLB) for the St. Louis Cardinals, Colorado Rockies and New York Mets, and for the SK Wyverns of the KBO League.

Major League Baseball

St. Louis Cardinals
Brown was drafted by the St. Louis Cardinals in the 18th round of the 2007 Major League Baseball draft out of the University of Nebraska–Lincoln.

2011
Brown was called up on June 12, 2011. After hitting .182 in 11 games for St. Louis, he was left off the team's postseason roster and designated for assignment on October 9.

Colorado Rockies

2012
He was claimed off waivers by the Colorado Rockies on October 12.

During the 2012 season, Brown appeared in 46 games for the Rockies, batting .232 with 5 home runs and 11 runs batted in. On the final day of the regular season, he was ejected by umpire Mark Ripperger for arguing that he had been hit by a pitch that was instead ruled a foul ball.

New York Mets

2013
On January 2, 2013 he signed a minor league contract with the New York Mets that contained an invitation to spring training.  He started the season in AAA with the Las Vegas 51s and was called up to the majors on May 3, 2013 when Collin Cowgill was optioned to Las Vegas. During Spring Training 2014 he changed his number from 47 to 30.

2014
On opening day, March 31, 2014, Brown started in place of Chris Young and hit a three-run home run in the first inning off of Stephen Strasburg.

He was claimed off waivers by the Oakland Athletics on October 31, 2014. The Athletics designated him for assignment on November 23, when they acquired Ike Davis. However, the Athletics did not tender him a contract by the December 2 deadline, and he became a free agent.

Los Angeles Angels of Anaheim
On February 2, 2016, Brown signed a minor league contract with Los Angeles Angels of Anaheim.

On February 29, 2016 he announced his retirement, stating he wished to spend more time with his family.

KBO League

SK Wyverns
On January 15, 2015, Andrew Brown signed a one-year, $700,000 contract with the SK Wyverns of the KBO League. During his lone season with the SK Wyverns, he hit .261 with 28 HRs and 76 RBIs.

References

External links

1984 births
Living people
People from Carrollton, Texas
Major League Baseball outfielders
Baseball infielders
Baseball players from Texas
St. Louis Cardinals players
Colorado Rockies players
New York Mets players
Batavia Muckdogs players
Quad Cities River Bandits players
SSG Landers players
American expatriate baseball players in South Korea
Palm Beach Cardinals players
Springfield Cardinals players
Gulf Coast Cardinals players
Memphis Redbirds players
Colorado Springs Sky Sox players
Las Vegas 51s players